Sewall A. Phillips was a member of the Wisconsin State Assembly.

Biography
Phillips was born on April 29, 1839 in Turner, Maine. He worked as a teacher. During the American Civil War, he served with the 2nd Regiment Wisconsin Volunteer Cavalry of the Union Army.

Assembly career
Phillips was a member of the Assembly during the 1880 and 1881 sessions. He was a Republican.

References

People from Turner, Maine
People from Waupaca County, Wisconsin
Republican Party members of the Wisconsin State Assembly
People of Wisconsin in the American Civil War
Union Army soldiers
Schoolteachers from Wisconsin
1839 births
Year of death missing